John Norman (1748–1817) was an engraver and publisher in Boston, Massachusetts, in the later 18th and early 19th century. "Born in England; came to Philadelphia in 1774 'from London,' as an 'architect and landscape engraver;' though he also did all manner of silversmith's work. He went to Boston about 1780." He died in 1817 and was buried in Copp's Hill Burying Ground.

See also
 Boston Magazine (1783–86), published by Norman
 Boston Directory. Norman published the first issue in 1789.

References

1748 births
1817 deaths
Businesspeople from Boston
People from colonial Boston
American publishers (people)
American engravers
Burials in Boston
Kingdom of England emigrants to Massachusetts Bay Colony